Union Sportive Cattin is an association football club from Central African Republic based in Bangui. 

In 1968 the team won the Central African Republic League.

Stadium
Currently the team plays at the 36,000 capacity Barthelemy Boganda Stadium.

Honours
Central African Republic League
Champion (1): 1968

Performance in CAF competitions
African Cup of Champions Clubs: 1 appearance
1969 – First Round

References

External links
Team profile – leballonrond.fr

Football clubs in the Central African Republic
Bangui